Free Creek was a band composed of many internationally renowned musical artists, including Eric Clapton, Jeff Beck, Keith Emerson, Mitch Mitchell and Linda Ronstadt, who recorded one album, in 1969, in a "super session" format.

Personnel 
Billy Chesboro - conductor  
Earle Doud - conductor, vocals

Vocals

Tom Cosgrove 
Hilda Harris
Timmy Harrison
Eric Mercury
Geri Miller
Linda Ronstadt
Valerie Simpson
Maretha Stewart

Brass, woodwinds, strings

Bill Chase Trumpet  
Chris Darrow Violin  
Bob Dean Trombone  
Louis del Gatto Trombone  
Joe Farrell Flute  
Harry Hall Trumpet  
Bob Keller Trombone  
Tom "Bones" Malone Trombone  
Meco Monardo Trombone  
Larry Packer Violin  
Alan Rubin Trumpet  
Lew Soloff Trumpet  
Chris Wood Flute

Drums, percussion

Richard Crooks Drums  
Adolfo de la Parra Drums  
Didymus Percussion   
Roy Markowitz Drums  
Mitch Mitchell Drums  
John Ware Drums

Keyboards

Dr. John Piano  
Keith Emerson Organ 
Jimmy Greenspoon Keyboards  
Mark "Moogy" Klingman Organ  
Bob Smith Organ

Guitar, bass

Jeff Beck (as "A.N. Other") Guitar
Delaney Bramlett Guitar
Eric Clapton (as "King Cool") Guitar
Richard Davis Bass  
Howard "Buzz" Feiten Guitar  
Carol Hunter Guitar  
Bernie Leadon Guitar  
John London Bass  
Harvey Mandel Guitar  
Chuck Rainey Bass  
Elliott Randall Guitar  
Red Rhodes Guitar (Steel)  
Douglas Rodriguez Guitar  
Todd Rundgren Guitar  
Larry Taylor Bass  
Jack Wilkins Guitar  
Stu Woods Bass

Discography 
1973 Music From Free Creek (Charisma) (2 album set, reissued 1976 by Charisma Records as Summit Meeting.  CD reissue 2002 and 2006 by Lake Eerie Records; recorded 1969)

References 

British supergroups
Rock music supergroups
Musical groups established in 1969